WLTP (910 kHz) is an AM radio station broadcasting a news/talk format. Licensed to Marietta, Ohio, United States, it serves the Parkersburg–Marietta area.  The station is owned by iHeartMedia, Inc.

History

The station began broadcasting August 4, 1964, and originally held the call sign WBRJ. In 1967, the station adopted a country music format. By 1980, the station was airing a MOR format. By 1989, the station was again airing a country music format. By 1991, the station had adopted a news-talk format.

In January 1995, the station's call sign was changed to WYLI, and by March 1995, the station had been taken silent. In summer of 1996, the station returned to the air, broadcasting a CHR format and carrying Imus in the Morning. In early 1998, the station was again taken silent.  In September of that year WYLI was purchased by WRCM Ltd. Under the direction of former WKNR (1220) broadcasters Todd Bartley and Jim Pogras the station returned to the air with an oldies format before transitioning to a locally based All Sports format as "AM Stereo 910 The Sport" that aggressively covered local sports, news, and had popular locally-hosted sports talk shows that rewarded fans who joined the "locker room.". In early 2000, the station was again taken silent. The station's former studio and tower location in Marietta was torn down to make room for a community water park. The towers were moved about eight miles southwest to Boaz, West Virginia. 

In 2001, the station's call sign was changed back to WBRJ, and the station returned to the air, continuing to air a sports format. In 2004, the station's call sign was changed to WLTP, and it adopted a talk format.

References

External links

 FCC History Cards For WLTP (AM) (1964-1980)

LTP
Marietta, Ohio
IHeartMedia radio stations
News and talk radio stations in the United States
Radio stations established in 1964
1964 establishments in Ohio